The 1998 Dartmouth Big Green football team was an American football team that represented Dartmouth College during the 1998 NCAA Division I-AA football season. The Big Green tied for last place in the Ivy League.

In its seventh season under head coach John Lyons, the team compiled a 2–8 record and was outscored 226 to 142. Johnathan Gibbs, Kyle Rogers and Adam Young were the team captains.

The Big Green's 1–6 conference record tied for seventh (and worst) in the Ivy League standings. Dartmouth was outscored 157 to 102 by Ivy opponents. 

Dartmouth played its home games at Memorial Field on the college campus in Hanover, New Hampshire.

Schedule

References

Dartmouth
Dartmouth Big Green football seasons
Dartmouth Big Green football